Danny Green (26 May 1903 – 1973) was an English character actor. He was best known for his role as the slow-witted ex-boxer "One-Round" Lawson in The Ladykillers.

He worked regularly in film, television and on the stage, including playing comic gangsters in the original London productions of Guys and Dolls (1953) and Do Re Mi (1961).

One of his last roles was as Lord Surrey in the Randal and Hopkirk episode Just for the Record in 1969.

Filmography

 The Crooked Billet (1929) - Rogers
 Atlantic (1929) - Passenger
 The Fire Raisers (1934) - Stedding's Henchman (uncredited)
 Wild Boy (1934) - Driver (uncredited)
 Things Are Looking Up (1935) - Big Black Fox
 Crime Over London (1936) - Klemm
 Silver Blaze (1937) - Barton, Moriarty's Henchman (uncredited)
 Midnight Menace (1937) - Socks, American Henchman
 Gangway (1937) - Shorty
 Jericho (1937) - Sergeant (uncredited)
 The Squeaker (1937) - Safecracker (uncredited)
 Non-Stop New York (1937) - Gangster (uncredited)
 Hey! Hey! USA (1938) - McGuire - Cop (uncredited)
 Sailors Three (1940) - Nightclub Bouncer (uncredited)
 Welcome, Mr. Washington (1944) - Hank (uncredited)
 Fiddlers Three (1944) - Lictor
 Madonna of the Seven Moons (1945) - Scorpi
 The Echo Murders (1945) - Carl
 The Man Within (1947) - Smuggler
 Dancing with Crime (1947) - Sid (uncredited)
 No Orchids for Miss Blandish (1948) - Flyn
 On the Spot (1948, TV film) - Con O'Hara
 Good-Time Girl (1948) - Smiling Billy
 Helter Skelter (1949) - Liftman (uncredited)
 Someone at the Door (1950) - Price
 Once a Sinner (1950) - Ticker James
 State Secret (1950) - Taxi Driver
 The Lady Craved Excitement (1950) - Boris
 Her Favourite Husband (1950) - Angel Face
 Mister Drake's Duck (1951) - Truck driver
 A Tale of Five Cities (1951) - Levinsky
 Whispering Smith Hits London (1952) - Cecil
 Little Big Shot (1952) - Big Mo
 Laughing Anne (1953) - Nicholas
 A Kid for Two Farthings (1955) - Bully Bason
 The Ladykillers (1955) - One-Round 
 Jumping for Joy (1956) - Plug Ugly
 Assignment Redhead (1956) - Yotti Blum
 Seven Waves Away (1957) - Joe Woolsek
 Interpol (1957) - Second Bartender
 Wideawake (1957, TV film) - 'Professor' Hagen
 A Santa for Christmas (1957, TV film) 
 A Tale of Two Cities (1958) - Grave Robber (uncredited)
 The 7th Voyage of Sinbad (1958) - Karim
 Hidden Homicide (1959) - Cliff Darby
 Beyond This Place (1959) - Roach
 In the Wake of a Stranger (1959) - Barnes
 Girls of the Latin Quarter (1960) - Hodgson
 Surprise Package (1960) - Nicky Canfield (uncredited)
 The Barber of Stamford Hill (broadcast 28th. July, 1960) - Mr. O - (ITV Television Playhouse, series 5, episode 47)
 Man in the Moon (1960) - Lorry driver
 The Fast Lady (1963) - Bandit
 The Old Dark House (1963) - Morgan Femm
 A Stitch in Time (1963) - Ticehurst, Man With Beard.
 Kiss Me Kate (1964, TV film) - Gangster
 Doctor in Clover (1966) - Ashby (uncredited)
 Smashing Time (1967)
 The Fixer (1968) - The Giggler (uncredited)

References

External links
 
 

1903 births
1973 deaths
20th-century English male actors
English male film actors
English male television actors
English male stage actors
Male actors from London